Ohavi Zedek (Hebrew for "Lovers of Justice") is a Conservative synagogue in Burlington, Vermont, United States.

History 
Founded in 1876, it is the oldest Jewish congregation in Vermont. The synagogue's original building, a brick Gothic Revival structure erected in 1885 (Old Ohavi Zedek Synagogue), is among the oldest synagogue buildings still standing in the United States. The building, at the corner of Archibald and Hyde Streets in Burlington, is listed on the National Register of Historic Places. The congregation moved to its present home on North Prospect Street in 1952. The Archibald Street building is now occupied by Congregation Ahavath Gerim.

See also 
 Oldest synagogues in the United States

References

External links 
 Ohavi Zedek

Conservative synagogues in the United States
Synagogues in Vermont
Religious organizations established in 1876
Synagogues completed in 1885
Buildings and structures in Burlington, Vermont
1876 establishments in Vermont
Synagogues completed in 1952
Jews and Judaism in Burlington, Vermont